Sun Valley station is a Metrolink train station located in the community of Sun Valley, Los Angeles, California. It is served by Metrolink's Antelope Valley Line between Los Angeles Union Station and Lancaster station.

Transit connections 
Los Angeles Metro Bus:

History 
The station of Roscoe, which was a former name for Sun Valley, was a flag stop on the railroad. It was the site of multiple train robberies conducted by William Haven "Kid" Thompson and Alva Johnson in 1894.

References

External links 

Metrolink stations in Los Angeles County, California
Railway stations in the United States opened in 2001
2001 establishments in California